The 1964 Brown Bears football team was an American football team that represented Brown University during the 1964 NCAA University Division football season. Brown tied for fourth in the Ivy League. 

In their sixth season under head coach John McLaughry, the Bears compiled a 5–4 record and outscored opponents 119 to 117. Ralph Duerre and John Perry were the team captains. 

The Bears' 3–4 conference record tied for fourth-best in the Ivy League standings. They were outscored by Ivy opponents 100 to 69. 

Brown played its home games at Brown Stadium in Providence, Rhode Island.

Schedule

References

Brown
Brown Bears football seasons
Brown Bears football